Dream of Pixels is a mobile game developed by Slovenian studio Dawn of Play and released on November 15, 2012. Its available for iOS and Android.

Gameplay
The gameplay is very similar to Tetris except players are able to cut out their own tetromino shapes from the wall and let them drop to clear rows.

Reception
The game has a Metacritic score of 86% based on 8 critic reviews.

SlideToPlay said " Regardless of the mode, Dream of Pixels is a fresh and fun take on the tried-and-true falling blocks game. " AppAdvice said " If you're in the mood for a fantastic falling blocks puzzle game, then I highly recommend you drop everything that you're doing right now and buy Dream of Pixels. In fact, if you can only get one game this week, make it this one. You won't regret it. "

TouchArcade wrote " The only potential flaws or suggestions I have for Dream of Pixels would be to allow players to switch out their tetromino or see upcoming tetrominoes for tactical strategies. Maybe it's not necessary, but seeing multiple pieces only in the puzzle mode's HUD made me miss them when they weren't in the others. " 148Apps wrote " It's amazing how fresh a classic puzzle game can feel with a little change in perspective. Dream of Pixels successfully revitalizes one of the most popular styles of puzzle, turns it on its head, and changes the rules while still keeping everything familiar."  AppSpy said " You'd think such a concept as reverse Tetris would be as easy to grasp as it would be trite, but Dream of Pixels is neither, delivering an engaging puzzle game with a unique concept. "

PocketGamer said " An interesting and engaging puzzler, Dream of Pixels isn't revolutionary, but it's an enjoyable beast all the same. " TouchGen concluded "A great puzzle game. It doesn't necessarily rewrite the book on puzzle games, but all in all, it's a solid package that is well worth a look if you are into the genre; especially Tetris-like puzzlers. "

References

2012 video games
Android (operating system) games
IOS games
Falling block puzzle games
Video games developed in Slovenia